|}

The Prix de Royallieu is a Group 1 flat horse race in France open to thoroughbred fillies and mares aged three years or older. It is run at Longchamp over a distance of 2,800 metres (about 1 mile and 6 furlongs), and it is scheduled to take place each year in late September or early October.

History
The event is named after Royallieu, an area where the stables of Frédéric de Lagrange were located in the late 19th century. The original version was open to horses of either gender aged three or older. It was contested over 3,000 metres in late October.

The race was restricted to three-year-old fillies and cut to 2,600 metres in 1922. It was cancelled in 1939 and 1940 because of World War II. For the following two years it was run at Le Tremblay over 2,500 metres, and it resumed at Longchamp in 1943.

The Prix de Royallieu was opened to older fillies and mares in 1965. It was given Group 3 status in 1971, and was shortened to 2,500 metres in 1972.

The event was promoted to Group 2 level and moved to the Prix de l'Arc de Triomphe weekend in 1988. The latter race is traditionally held on the first Sunday of October. The race was run at Group 1 level for the first time in 2019, when the distance was increased from 2500 metres to 2800 metres.

Records
Most successful horse since 1922 (2 wins):
 The Juliet Rose – 2016, 2017

Leading jockey since 1922 (6 wins):
 Gérald Mossé – 	Saganeca (1991), Dalara (1994), Mouramara (2000), Daryakana (2009), Maria Royal (2010), Frine (2014)
 Frankie Dettori – Annaba (1996), Tulipa	(1997), Moon Queen (2001), 	Anna Pavlova (2007), Anapurna (2019), Loving Dream (2021)

Leading trainer since 1922 (8 wins):
 Alain de Royer-Dupré – Euliya (1984), Sharaniya (1986), Dalara (1994), Daryakana (2009), Maria Royal (2010), Dalkala (2012), Ebiyza (2013), Candarliya (2015)

Leading owner since 1922 (8 wins):
 HH Aga Khan IV – Euliya (1984), Sharaniya (1986), Dalara (1994), Mouramara (2000), Daryakana (2009), Dalkala (2012), Ebiyza (2013), Candarliya (2015)

Winners since 1975

Earlier winners

 1922: Chantepie
 1923: Pomare
 1924: Tetratela
 1925: Frisette
 1926: Gitane
 1927: Buanderie
 1928: L'Olivete
 1929: Nitakrit
 1930: Aude
 1931: Brunhild
 1932: Foxarella
 1933: Armoise
 1934: Samee
 1935: Medea
 1936: Miraflore
 1937: Kiss Curl
 1938: Queen
 1939–40: no race
 1941: Veronique
 1942: Fidgette
 1943: Pistole
 1944–45: no race
 1946: Campanelle
 1947: Apostille
 1948: Frenaux
 1949:
 1950: Polaire
 1951: Monrovia
 1952: Lovely Princess
 1953: Donica
 1954: Rowena
 1955: Vallee du Gave
 1956:
 1957: Tehmany
 1958: Dalaba
 1959: Persepolis
 1960: Pasquinade
 1961: Bobette
 1962: L'X
 1963: Monique
 1964:
 1965: Cassette
 1966: Andrusa
 1967: Monatrea
 1968: Silana
 1969: Riverside
 1970: Prime Abord
 1971: Example
 1972: Guillotina
 1973: Sybarite
 1974: Ambrellita

See also
 List of French flat horse races

References

 France Galop / Racing Post:

 france-galop.com – A Brief History: Prix de Royallieu.
 galop.courses-france.com – Prix de Royallieu – Palmarès depuis 1980.
 galopp-sieger.de – Prix de Royallieu.
 horseracingintfed.com – International Federation of Horseracing Authorities – Prix de Royallieu (2018).
 pedigreequery.com – Prix de Royallieu – Longchamp.

Long-distance horse races for fillies and mares
Longchamp Racecourse
Horse races in France